This is a list of 164 species in Phyllobius, a genus of broad-nosed weevils in the family Curculionidae.

Phyllobius species

 Phyllobius achardi Desbrochers des Loges, 1873 c g
 Phyllobius aetolicus Apfelbeck, 1901 c g
 Phyllobius alpinus Stierlin, 1859 c g
 Phyllobius altaicus Gebler, 1833 c g
 Phyllobius alternans Bajtenov, 1974 c g
 Phyllobius annectens Sharp, 1896 c g
 Phyllobius arborator (Herbst, 1797) c g
 Phyllobius argentatus Linnaeus, 1758 c g
 Phyllobius armatus Roelofs, 1876 c g
 Phyllobius armeniacus Kirsch, 1878 c g
 Phyllobius atlasicus Hustache, 1933 c g
 Phyllobius baicalicus Korotyaev, 1979 c g
 Phyllobius ballionis Stark, 1889 c g
 Phyllobius banghaasi Schilsky, 1908 c g
 Phyllobius betulinus Bechstein & Scharfenberg, 1805 c g
 Phyllobius brenskei Schilsky, 1911 c g
 Phyllobius brevis Gyllenhal, 1834 c g
 Phyllobius bulgaricus Apfelbeck, 1915 c g
 Phyllobius cambyses Pesarini, 1981 c g
 Phyllobius canus Gyllenhal, 1834 c g
 Phyllobius cervinus Hochhuth, 1847 c g
 Phyllobius cinerascens (Fabricius, 1792) g
 Phyllobius circassicus Reitter, 1888 c g
 Phyllobius claviger Faust, 1889 c g
 Phyllobius confusus Schilsky, 1912 c g
 Phyllobius contemptus Schoenherr, 1832 c g
 Phyllobius crassipes Motschulsky, 1860 c g
 Phyllobius crassus Motschulsky, 1860 c g
 Phyllobius cupreoaureus Stierlin, 1861 c g
 Phyllobius cylindricollis Gyllenhal, 1834 c g
 Phyllobius dahli Korotyaev, 1984 c g
 Phyllobius dalabanus Voss, 1956 c g
 Phyllobius delagrangei Desbrochers des Loges, 1892 c g
 Phyllobius derjugini Smirnov, 1913 c g
 Phyllobius deyrollei Tournier, 1877 c g
 Phyllobius dispar Redtenbacher, 1849 c g
 Phyllobius emeryi Desbrochers des Loges, 1873 c g
 Phyllobius emgei Stierlin, 1887 c g
 Phyllobius emmrichi Bajtenov, 1980 c g
 Phyllobius eques Reitter, 1913 c g
 Phyllobius etruscus Desbrochers des Loges, 1872 c g
 Phyllobius euchromus Reitter, 1885 c g
 Phyllobius exaequatus Faust, 1885 c g
 Phyllobius farinosus Motschulsky, 1860 c g
 Phyllobius femoralis Boheman, 1842 c g
 Phyllobius fessus Boheman, 1843 g
 Phyllobius festae F. Solari, 1925 c g
 Phyllobius flecki Reitter, 1906 c g
 Phyllobius fulvago (Gyllenhal, 1834) c g
 Phyllobius fulvagoides Reitter, 1885 c g
 Phyllobius fumigatus Boheman, 1843 c g
 Phyllobius ganglbaueri Apfelbeck, 1915 c g
 Phyllobius glaucus (Scopoli, 1763) i c g
 Phyllobius globicollis Morimoto & Miyakawa, 2006 c g
 Phyllobius gomadanensis Morimoto & Miyakawa, 2006 c g
 Phyllobius granicollis Pesarini, 1970 c g
 Phyllobius grubovi Korotyaev, 1984 c g
 Phyllobius grunini Korotyaev & Egorov, 1977 c g
 Phyllobius haberhaueri Apfelbeck, 1915 c g
 Phyllobius harlachingensis Gistel, 1857 c g
 Phyllobius helenae Korotyaev & Egorov, 1977 c g
 Phyllobius hirtipennis (Hustache, 1921) c g
 Phyllobius hiurai Morimoto & Miyakawa, 2006 c g
 Phyllobius hochhuthi Faust, 1883 c g
 Phyllobius ichihashii Morimoto & Miyakawa, 2006 c g
 Phyllobius incomptus Sharp, 1896 c g
 Phyllobius insidiosus Pesarini, 1981 c g
 Phyllobius insulanus Schilsky, 1911 c g
 Phyllobius intrusus Kono, 1948 i b  (arborvitae weevil)
 Phyllobius italicus A. Solari & F. Solari, 1904 c g
 Phyllobius jacobsoni Smirnov, 1913 c g
 Phyllobius japonicus Faust, 1889 c g
 Phyllobius kajigamori Morimoto & Miyakawa, 2006 c g
 Phyllobius kantoensis Morimoto & Miyakawa, 2006 c g
 Phyllobius karamanensis Voss, 1964 c g
 Phyllobius kaszabi L. Arnoldi & Korotyaev, 1977 c g
 Phyllobius kerzhneri Korotyaev & Egorov, 1977 c g
 Phyllobius kolymensis Korotyaev & Egorov, 1977 c g
 Phyllobius korbi Schilsky, 1908 c g
 Phyllobius kozlovi Korotyaev & Egorov, 1977 c g
 Phyllobius kuldzhanus Suvorov, 1915 c g
 Phyllobius kumanoensis Morimoto & Miyakawa, 2006 c g
 Phyllobius kurosonensis Morimoto & Miyakawa, 2006 c g
 Phyllobius lateralis Reiche, 1857 c g
 Phyllobius lederi Schilsky, 1911 c g
 Phyllobius lenkoranus Schilsky, 1911 c g
 Phyllobius leonhardi Schilsky, 1908 c g
 Phyllobius leonisi Pic, 1902 c g
 Phyllobius lewisi (Sharp, 1896) c g
 Phyllobius litoralis Faust, 1887 c g
 Phyllobius lodosi Pesarini, 1975 c g
 Phyllobius logunovi Korotyaev, 1995 c g
 Phyllobius longipilis Boheman, 1842 c g
 Phyllobius lukjanovitshi Korotyaev & Egorov, 1977 c g
 Phyllobius maculicornis Germar, 1824 c g
 Phyllobius maculosus Motschulsky, 1860 c g
 Phyllobius mediatus Reitter, 1888 c g
 Phyllobius meschniggi F. Solari, 1938 c g
 Phyllobius mixtus Hochhuth, 1847 c g
 Phyllobius mongolicus Korotyaev & Egorov, 1977 c g
 Phyllobius montanus Miller, 1862 c g
 Phyllobius nigrofasciatus Pesarini, 1974 c g
 Phyllobius noesskei Apfelbeck, 1915 c g
 Phyllobius nudiamplus Reitter, 1916 c g
 Phyllobius oblongus (Linnaeus, 1758) i c g b  (European snout beetle)
 Phyllobius obovatus Gebler, 1834 c g
 Phyllobius obscuripes Schilsky, 1911 c g
 Phyllobius occidentalis Morimoto & Miyakawa, 2006 c g
 Phyllobius pallidipennis Hochhuth, 1847 c g
 Phyllobius pallidus (Fabricius, 1792) c g
 Phyllobius parcus Voss, 1956 c g
 Phyllobius parviceps Desbrochers des Loges, 1873 c g
 Phyllobius parvicollis Korotyaev & Egorov, 1977 c g
 Phyllobius pellitus Boheman, 1842 c g
 Phyllobius peneckei F. Solari, 1931 c g
 Phyllobius perspicillatus Pesarini, 1971 c g
 Phyllobius pesarinii Borovec & Magnano, 2004 c g
 Phyllobius picipes Motschulsky, 1861 c g
 Phyllobius pilicornis Desbrochers des Loges, 1873 c g
 Phyllobius pilidorsum Desbrochers des Loges, 1895 c g
 Phyllobius pilipes Desbrochers des Loges, 1872 c g
 Phyllobius pomaceus Gyllenhal, 1834 c g
 Phyllobius potanini Korotyaev, 1979 c g
 Phyllobius profanus Faust, 1881 c g
 Phyllobius prolongatus Motschulsky, 1860 c g
 Phyllobius przewalskii Korotyaev, 1979 c g
 Phyllobius pubipennis Pesarini, 1981 c g
 Phyllobius pyri Linnaeus, 1758 c g
 Phyllobius quercicola Apfelbeck, 1916 c g
 Phyllobius raverae A. Solari & F. Solari, 1903 c g
 Phyllobius reicheidius Desbrochers des Loges, 1872 c g
 Phyllobius rhodopensis Apfelbeck, 1898 c g
 Phyllobius roboretanus Gredler, 1882 c g
 Phyllobius rochati Pesarini, 1981 c g
 Phyllobius romanus Faust, 1890 c g
 Phyllobius roseipennis Pesarini, 1973 c g
 Phyllobius rotundicollis Roelofs, 1873 c g
 Phyllobius russicus Stierlin, 1884 c g
 Phyllobius sahlbergi Faust, 1890 c g
 Phyllobius sauricus Korotyaev & Egorov, 1977 c g
 Phyllobius schatzmayri Pesarini, 1981 c g
 Phyllobius scutellaris Redtenbacher, 1849 g
 Phyllobius seladonius Brullé, 1832 c g
 Phyllobius shigematsui Morimoto & Miyakawa, 2006 c g
 Phyllobius solarii Schilsky, 1911 c g
 Phyllobius solskyi Faust, 1885 c g
 Phyllobius squamosus C.N.F. Brisout de Barneville, 1866 c g
 Phyllobius subdentatus Boheman, 1842 c g
 Phyllobius subnudus Kôno, 1928 c g
 Phyllobius thalassinus Gyllenhal, 1834 c g
 Phyllobius transsylvanicus Stierlin, 1894 c g
 Phyllobius tridentinus Stierlin, 1894 c g
 Phyllobius tuberculifer Chevrolat, 1866 c g
 Phyllobius tuvensis Korotyaev & Egorov, 1977 c g
 Phyllobius valonensis Apfelbeck, 1915 c g
 Phyllobius verae Korotyaev, 1984 c g
 Phyllobius versipellis Apfelbeck, 1915 c g
 Phyllobius vespertinus (Fabricius, 1792) c g
 Phyllobius virens Faust, 1890 c g
 Phyllobius virideaeris (Laicharting, 1781) c g
 Phyllobius viridicollis (Fabricius, 1792) c g
 Phyllobius wittmeri Pesarini, 1971 c g
 Phyllobius xanthocnemus Kiesenwetter, 1852 c g
 Phyllobius zherichini Korotyaev & Egorov, 1977 c g

Data sources: i = ITIS, c = Catalogue of Life, g = GBIF, b = Bugguide.net

References

Phyllobius